Seveci Taka (born December 25, 1981) is a Fijian rugby union player. He plays halfback. Seveci made his international debut for Fiji against Tonga at Gosford in 2006. In that same year he played against the Junior All Blacks. Seveci was picked to represent Fiji again during the Fiji November tour where they will play against France, Wales and Italy.

External links
Fiji Rugby Union profile
Fijilive News

1981 births
Living people
Fijian rugby union players
Rugby union scrum-halves
Fiji international rugby union players
People from Sigatoka